San Francisco (IPA: [sɐn fɾɐn'sisko]), officially the Municipality of San Francisco, is a 5th class municipality in the province of Southern Leyte, Philippines. According to the 2020 census, it has a population of 13,436 people.

History
In December 2003, a landslide destroyed most of barangay Punta, killing 200 people.

Geography

Barangays
San Francisco is politically subdivided into 22 barangays.

Climate

Demographics

Economy

References

External links
 San Francisco Profile at PhilAtlas.com
 [ Philippine Standard Geographic Code]
Local Governance Performance Management System

Municipalities of Southern Leyte